Andrei Ioan Cordea (born 24 June 1999) is a Romanian professional footballer who plays as a winger or an attacking midfielder for Liga I club FCSB and the Romania national team.

Club career
Cordea moved to FCSB from Academia Clinceni for an undisclosed transfer fee on 5 June 2021, signing a five-year deal with a €10 million buyout clause. On 15 July, he registered his debut in a goalless draw at Botoșani. 

Cordea scored his first goal for the Roș-albaștrii seven days later, in a 1–0 UEFA Europa Conference League defeat of Shakter Karagandy. On the 25th, he netted his first Liga I goal against Universitatea Craiova.

On 12 September 2021, he scored in a 6–0 rout of Dinamo București, which registered the greatest goal difference ever in the Eternal derby.

International career
Following his good display at FCSB, Cordea received his first call-up to the Romania national team and made his debut on 5 September 2021, in a 2–0 defeat of Liechtenstein counting for the 2022 FIFA World Cup qualifiers.

Career statistics

Club

International

References

External links
Andrei Cordea at Liga Profesionistă de Fotbal 

1999 births
Living people
People from Aiud
Romanian footballers
Romania youth international footballers
Romania international footballers
Association football midfielders
Serie C players
Novara F.C. players
Liga I players
FC Hermannstadt players
LPS HD Clinceni players
FC Steaua București players
Romanian expatriate footballers
Romanian expatriate sportspeople in Italy
Expatriate footballers in Italy